Xanthotype is a genus of moths in the family Geometridae described by Warren in 1894.

Species
Listed alphabetically:
Xanthotype attenuaria Swett, 1918 – attentive crocus soldier
Xanthotype barnesi Swett, 1918
Xanthotype rufaria Swett, 1918 – rufous geometer
Xanthotype sospeta (Drury, 1773) – crocus geometer
Xanthotype urticaria Swett, 1918 – false crocus geometer

References

Angeronini